Hora white carp (Cirrhinus macrops) is a species of ray-finned fish in the genus Cirrhinus from India. Some authorities regard it as a synonym of Cirrhinus mrigala.

Footnotes 
 

Cirrhinus
Carp
Fish described in 1870